"Innocent Man (Misunderstood)" is a song by American hip hop recording artist Cassidy. It was officially released on December 22, 2007 as the second single from his third studio album, B.A.R.S. The Barry Adrian Reese Story (2007). The song, which was produced by Cassidy's longtime mentor and frequent collaborator Swizz Beatz, features vocals from English R&B singer Mark Morrison, sampling his song "Innocent Man".

Background
In an interview with FMQB Radio, Cassidy gave insight on the song:

Charts

References

2007 singles
Cassidy (rapper) songs
Mark Morrison songs
Song recordings produced by Swizz Beatz
Songs written by Swizz Beatz
Songs written by Mark Morrison
2007 songs